Japan has a nationwide system of  distinct from the expressways. The Ministry of Land, Infrastructure, Transport and Tourism and other government agencies administer the national highways. Beginning in 1952, Japan classified these as Class 1 or Class 2. Class 1 highways had one- or two-digit numbers, while Class 2 highways had three-digit numbers. For example, routes 1 and 57 were Class 1 highways while 507 (the one with the highest number) was a Class 2 highway.

A 1964 amendment to the governing law resulted in a unification of the classes, which took effect in April of the following year. Highways numbered since that time have had three-digit numbers, so the numbers 58–100, which had so far been unused, remained unused. However, when Okinawa Prefecture reverted to Japanese control in 1972, Route 58, with its southern endpoint in Okinawa's capital city of Naha, was established. The numbers from 59 to 100 remain unused. Some other numbers have been vacated by the joining or changing of routes: 109 (joined with 108), 110 (renumbered as 48), 111 (renumbered as 45), 214–216 (joined to form 57).

List of national highways

1 to 58
Initially established as "Class 1 highways", except Route 58

1 2 3 4 5 
6 7 8 9 10 
11 12 13 14 15 
16 17 18 19 20 
21 22 23 24 25 
26 27 28 29 30 
31 32 33 34 35 
36 37 38 39 40 
41 42 43 44 45 
46 47 48 49 50 
51 52 53 54 55 
56 57 58

101 to 199
101 102 103 104 105 
106 107 108 112 113 
114 115 116 117 118 
119 120 121 122 123 
124 125 126 127 128 
129 130 131 132 133 
134 135 136 137 138 
139 140 141 142 143
144 145 146 147 148 
149 150 151 152 153 
154 155 156 157 158 
159 160 161 162 163 
164 165 166 167 168 
169 170 171 172 173 
174 175 176 177 178 
179 180 181 182 183 
184 185 186 187 188 
189 190 191 192 193 
194 195 196 197 198 
199

200 to 299
200
201 202 203 204 205 
206 207 208 209 210 
211 212 213 217 218 
219 220 221 222 223 
224 225 226 227 228 
229 230 231 232 233 
234 235 236 237 238 
239 240 241 242 243 
244 245 246 247 248 
249 250 251 252 253 
254 255 256 257 258 
259 260 261 262 263 
264 265 266 267 268 
269 270 271 272 273 
274 275 276 277 278 
279 280 281 282 283 
284 285 286 287 288 
289 290 291 292 293 
294 295 296 297 298 
299

300 to 399
300
301 302 303 304 305 
306 307 308 309 310 
311 312 313 314 315 
316 317 318 319 320 
321 322 323 324 325 
326 327 328 329 330 
331 332 333 334 335 
336 337 338 339 340
341 342 343 344 345 
346 347 348 349 350 
351 352 353 354 355 
356 357 358 359 360 
361 362 363 364 365 
366 367 368 369 370 
371 372 373 374 375 
376 377 378 379 380 
381 382 383 384 385 
386 387 388 389 390 
391 392 393 394 395 
396 397 398 399

400 to 499
400
401 402 403 404 405 
406 407 408 409 410 
411 412 413 414 415 
416 417 418 419 420
421 422 423 424 425 
426 427 428 429 430 
431 432 433 434 435 
436 437 438 439 440 
441 442 443 444 445 
446 447 448 449 450 
451 452 453 454 455 
456 457 458 459 460 
461 462 463 464 465 
466 467 468 469 470 
471 472 473 474 475 
476 477 478 479 480 
481 482 483 484 485
486 487 488 489 490 
491 492 493 494 495
496 497 498 499

500 to 507
500
501 502 503 504 505
506 507

Gallery

References

 
Lists of roads in Japan
Transport systems